Maram is a 1973 Indian Malayalam film, directed and produced by Yusuf Ali Kechery. The film stars Prem Nazir, Jayabharathi, KPAC Lalitha and Adoor Bhasi in the lead roles. The film had musical score by G. Devarajan.

Cast
 
Prem Nazir as Ibrahim 
Jayabharathi as Aamina
K. P. Ummer as Khadar 
Nellikode Bhaskaran as Aymutti 
KPAC Lalitha as Janu 
Bahadoor as Mollakka 
Adoor Bhasi as Bappootti
Philomina  as Aaminas Mother
T. S. Muthaiah as Nair 
Chowalloor Krishnankutty
Nilambur Balan 
M. O. Devasya 
Abbas 
Kedamangalam Ali 
 Metlda
 Sumathi
 Venkichan
 Hari Neendakara
 Vijayan Karanthur
 P.N.M Ali Koya
 Kanmanam
 Kumari Sathi
 P.K Shekar

Soundtrack
The music was composed by G. Devarajan and the lyrics were written by Moinkutty Vaidyar and Yusufali Kechery.

References

External links
 

1973 films
1970s Malayalam-language films
Films directed by Yusufali Kechery